Ehud Asherie (born 1979) is a jazz pianist and organist.

Early life
Asherie was born in Israel in 1979. He moved with his family to Italy at the age of three, where he attended the Sir James Henderson School, now The British School of Milan, and then to the United States when he was nine. As a teenager in New York, he visited Smalls Jazz Club, and took lessons from Frank Hewitt, a pianist who often played there. Asherie first played at Smalls when he was a high school sophomore.

Later life and career
Asherie played Hammond organ on his 2010 quartet release, Organic. He recorded his first solo piano album, Welcome to New York, in 2010.

Playing style
AllMusic's Ken Dryden commented on Asherie's Welcome to New York that "on his earlier CDs he mixed bop, swing, and standards with an occasional taste of stride, but for these solo piano sessions, he focuses more on stride and standards".

Discography
An asterisk (*) indicates that the year is that of release.

As leader/co-leader

As sideman

References

1979 births
Living people
Date of birth missing (living people)
21st-century American male musicians
21st-century American pianists
American jazz pianists
American male pianists
American people of Israeli descent
American male jazz musicians
Posi-Tone Records artists
Arbors Records artists